Rocca di Cave is a  (municipality) in the Metropolitan City of Rome in the Italian region of Latium, located about  east of Rome.

It is home to the remains of the Colonna family's castle, which today houses a Geo-Palaeontological Museum and an astronomical observation point.

References

Cities and towns in Lazio
Castles in Italy